Matameye is a town and urban commune, administrative centre of the Matameye Department in Niger, with a population of 17,930 as of 2001. In 2005 a road was completed from Matameye to Takieta. Since 2011 many people have moved to Matameye from Tânout and Gouré because of the food crisis, in search for better harvests, abandoning their homes and schools.

References

Populated places in Niger